The Ottawa Agreement may refer to:
 British Empire Economic Conference
 NATO Ottawa Agreement